Abalgamash ( a-ba-al-ga-masz) was a king of Marhashi ("Parahshum" in Akkadian) circa 2370 BCE, somewhere on the Iranian plateau. He seems to have led the forces of Elam, Marhashi, Kupin, Zahara and Meluhha into a coalition against the Akkadian Empire, invading Khuzestan, which had been occupied by Sargon of Akkad. This led to a direct conflict with Rimush, Sargon's son and successor, who in turn invaded Elam, and victoriously confronted their armies somewhere between Awan and Susa. 

Abalgamash appears in the records of the Rimush, the ruler of the Akkadian Empire at the time, who led victorious campaigns against Elam and Marhashi (Sumerian name for the Akkadian "Parahshum"). According to the account, troops from the Indus Valley civilization (Meluhha) also participated in the conflict:

The campaign resulted in 16,212 killed on the side of the enemies, and 4,216 prisoners. Rimush also came back with an important booty taken from Elam, consisting in 300 minas of gold (about 180 kilograms), 3600 minas of silver, 300 slaves, and vases of diorite and chlorite. These events apparently put an end to the influence of Marhashi in Elam.

Abalgamash had a general named Sidgau, who is also known to have been in conflict against Sargon of Akkad, the father of Rimush, when Sargon led his campaign against Elam and Marhashi. 

It has been argued that both names Abalgamash and Sidgau may be Hurrian.

References

3rd-millennium BC births
3rd-millennium BC deaths